The orange-footed sea cucumber (Cucumaria frondosa) is the largest sea cucumber in New England, United States. It is one of the most abundant and widespread species of holothurians within the North Atlantic Ocean and the Barents Sea (Russia), being most abundant along the eastern coast of North America.

Description
This species has a football shape with a leathery skin ranging in colour from yellowish white to dark brownish-black and is covered with five rows of retractile tube feet. The young are about 1 mm to 6 mm long and are translucent orange and pink. Three of these bands of tube feet are found on bottom whereas the top rows are often reduced. Adults of C. frondosa have a reduced numbers of spicules (skeletal structures) shaped like rounded plates with many holes. The sexes can be identified by the conspicuous tube-shaped (female) or heart-shaped (male) gonopore located under the crown of oral tentacles.

Habitat
Their habitat is rocks, crevices or low-tide Arctic water. They are known to cover vast areas of the substrate at depths of less than 30 meters (100 ft).

Feeding
The sea cucumber has modified its oral tube feet to form tentacles surrounding its mouth which are retracted when disturbed or bringing food into its mouth. The tentacles are displayed in a ring form with ten individual tentacles that are each highly branched looking treelike. Most sea cucumbers are deposit feeders but Cucumaria frondosa are a suspension feeding organism where they catch available particles in the ocean on their tentacles.

Sea cucumbers were tested in the Atlantic Ocean to see if there was seasonality to the feeding of cucumbers. Specifically C. frondosa were shown to have this feeding adaptation, and feed only in the spring (March to April) when the day length, water temperature, and chlorophyll concentration began to increase. A combination of these environmental cues is accountable for the feeding of C. frondosa because just one of them is not enough to trigger the animal to start eating. The chlorophyll concentration increases during this time due to a phytoplankton bloom season and larger amount of primary production. The cucumber does not eat through the colder seasons and will start back up again in the spring.

References

Cucumariidae
Fauna of the Arctic Ocean
Fauna of the Atlantic Ocean
Fauna of the Pacific Ocean
Animals described in 1767
Taxa named by Johan Ernst Gunnerus